AK92 may refer to:

Places

 Martin Field Airport (Alaska) (FAA airport code "AK92"), an airport in Lazy Mountain, Alaska, U.S.

Other uses

USS Eridanus (AK-92), a 1943 ship